Tracing Cowboys is a 2008 American romantic drama film directed by Jason Wolfsohn, starring Sacha Grunpeter and Megan Edwards. Grunpeter died on the film's last scheduled day of shooting.

Cast
 Sacha Grunpeter as Ethan
 Megan Edwards as Debbie
 Eileen Dietz as Marilyn
 Alvaro Alvarez as Fernando
 Ana Alvarez as Alba
 Veronica Fernandez as Estrella

Release
The film premiered at the AFI Dallas International Film Festival on 29 March 2008.

Reception
Joe Leydon of Variety wrote that the film's issues include Wolfsohn's "inability to follow his initial gameplan" and Grunpeter's voiceover narration. He also wrote that due to Grunpeter's death, his performance "comes off as compelling but, alas, incomplete." Despite the film's issues, Leydon wrote that it "has a curiosity value that cannot be measured or denied", and "may prove most instructive for anyone — academics, film buffs, would-be feature helmers — who’s curious to see how a filmmaker copes with a worst-case scenario."

Mark Olsen of the Los Angeles Times wrote that while the film "does have a certain impressionist grace", its "romantic ideal of the road -- lonely diners, vintage cars and seaside shanties -- seems misplaced, oversimplified and overused."

Ernest Hady of LA Weekly wrote that while Morrison's cinematography gives the film a "meditative beauty", Edwards' voice-over is "filled with clichéd philosophizing" and "drags the film down".

References

External links
 
 

American romantic drama films
2008 romantic drama films